Bente Nyland (born 12 August 1958) is a Norwegian geologist. She is Director General of the Norwegian Petroleum Directorate from 1 January 2008, having been appointed by the Government of Norway in a cabinet meeting on 21 December 2007.

She is a fellow of the Norwegian Academy of Technological Sciences.

References

1958 births
Living people
Norwegian petroleum geologists
20th-century Norwegian geologists
21st-century Norwegian geologists
Directors of government agencies of Norway
Members of the Norwegian Academy of Technological Sciences